The Tomb of Ya'qub ibn al-Layth al-Saffar or Yaghub Leys Safari (Persian: آرامگاه یعقوب‌ لیث صفاری) was built by the Saffarid dynasty and this building is located in Gundeshapur in Dezful County, Khuzestan Province, Iran. It is the tomb of Ya'qub ibn al-Layth al-Saffar, the founder of the Saffarid dynasty.

References 

Mausoleums in Iran
National works of Iran
Saffarid dynasty
Buildings and structures in Khuzestan Province